Alford House is a youth club in Aveline Road, Oval, London, England that was subject of the 1959 documentary
"We Are the Lambeth Boys".

It may also refer to:

In England
Alford Manor House, a Grade II* listed building in Alford, Lincolnshire

In the United States
Alford-Nielson House, Ferndale, Humboldt County, California
Leslie-Alford-Mims House, Holly Springs, Wake County, North Carolina

See also
Alford Building, in the Sylvester Commercial Historic District, Sylvester, Georgia, U.S.